Choi Ye-bin (born September 2, 1998) is a South Korean actress. She is best known for role in The Penthouse: War in Life (2020–2021), where she rose to prominence for playing the villainous soprano student Ha Eun-byeol.

Filmography

Film

Television series

Web series

Television show

Theatre

Other ventures

Endorsement
In February 2021, she has been chosen as a model for BUCKAROO.

Awards and nominations

References

External links 
 Official website 
 Choi Ye-bin on Instagram

1998 births
Living people
21st-century South Korean actresses
South Korean film actresses
South Korean stage actresses
South Korean television actresses
Ye-bin